Orla O'Rourke is an Irish actress known for her role in the 2014 film Calvary.

Early life and education

O'Rourke was born in Zambia to Irish parents. Her family returned to Ireland when she was five. At 13, she entered drama school. At 16, she acted in public in Adult Child/ Dead Child. Orla earned a degree in film and broadcasting.

Career

While still studying, O'Rourke began her first regular role as "Sinead Kelly" in the television show The Clinic. She then worked on Malice Aforethought for director David Blair. She acted in a first feature film The Front Line, directed by David Gleeson.

After graduation, she worked in England on the TV drama Casualty and the film Harry Brown with Michael Caine, Emily Mortimer, and Charlie Creed-Miles.

Filmography
O'Rourke has acted in the following.

Film

Television

References

External links
 
 Orla O'Rourke

Living people
21st-century Irish actresses
Year of birth missing (living people)
Irish film actresses
Irish television actresses
Place of birth missing (living people)